The 2020 German Open was the first event of the 2020 ITTF World Tour. It took place from 28 January to 2 February in Magdeburg, Germany.

Men's singles

Seeds 

 Xu Xin (champion)
 Fan Zhendong (quarterfinals)
 Ma Long (final)
 Lin Gaoyuan (semifinals)
 Tomokazu Harimoto (first round)
 Lin Yun-ju (second round)
 Liang Jingkun (first round)
 Mattias Falck (first round)
 Timo Boll (second round)
 Dimitrij Ovtcharov (semifinals)
 Koki Niwa (second round)
 Jang Woo-jin (first round)
 Jun Mizutani (quarterfinals)
 Patrick Franziska (first round)
 Lee Sang-su (first round)
 Jeoung Young-sik (first round)

Top half

Bottom half

Finals

Women's singles

Seeds 

 Chen Meng (champion)
 Sun Yingsha (quarterfinals)
 Liu Shiwen (quarterfinals)
 Mima Ito (quarterfinals)
 Zhu Yuling (semifinals)
 Wang Manyu (semifinals)
 Ding Ning (final)
 Cheng I-ching (first round)
 Feng Tianwei (first round)
 Kasumi Ishikawa (second round)
 Miu Hirano (first round)
 Chen Xingtong (first round)
 He Zhuojia (second round)
 Sofia Polcanova (first round)
 Petrissa Solja (second round)
 Han Ying (first round)

Top half

Bottom half

Finals

Men's doubles

Seeds 

 Jeoung Young-sik / Lee Sang-su (semifinals)
 Lin Gaoyuan / Ma Long (final)
 Liao Cheng-ting / Lin Yun-ju (first round)
 Benedikt Duda / Qiu Dang (first round)
 Chen Chien-an / Chuang Chih-yuan (first round)
 Ovidiu Ionescu /  Álvaro Robles (first round)
 Robert Gardos / Daniel Habesohn (first round)
 Nandor Ecseki / Adam Szudi (first round)

Draw

Women's doubles

Seeds 

 Chen Meng / Wang Manyu (champion)
 Chen Szu-yu / Cheng Hsien-tzu (quarterfinals)
 Ding Ning / Sun Yingsha (semifinals)
 Barbora Balážová /  Hana Matelová (first round)
 Lee Ho Ching / Minnie Soo Wai Yam (quarterfinals)
 Miu Hirano / Kasumi Ishikawa (final)
 Sofia Polcanova /  Bernadette Szőcs (first round)
 Nina Mittelham / Petrissa Solja (semifinals)

Draw

Mixed doubles

Seeds 

 Xu Xin / Liu Shiwen (champions)
 Lin Yun-ju / Cheng I-ching (semifinals)
 Wong Chun Ting / Doo Hoi Kem (quarterfinals)
 Jun Mizutani / Mima Ito (final)
 Ľubomír Pištej / Barbora Balážová (quarterfinals)
 Ho Kwan Kit / Lee Ho Ching (quarterfinals)
 Stefan Fegerl / Sofia Polcanova (first round)
 Patrick Franziska / Petrissa Solja (semifinals)

Draw

References 

German Open
2020 in German sport
Table tennis competitions in Germany
German Open
German Open